The Fiesta Tableware Company (formerly The Homer Laughlin China Company) is a ceramics manufacturer located in Newell, West Virginia, United States. Established in 1871, it is widely known for its Art Deco glazed dinnerware line, Fiesta. 

In March 2020, the storied Homer Laughlin China Company sold its food services divisions and the Homer Laughlin name to Steelite International, a British-based international tableware manufacturer.  The company retained its retail division, including the prominent Fiesta line as well as the manufacturing and marketing operations in Newell, West Virginia — rebranding the company as the Fiesta Tableware Company.

In 2002, The New York Times called Fiesta "the most collected brand of china in the United States".

History

The Fiesta Tableware Company originated as Laughlin Pottery, a two-kiln pottery on the banks of the Ohio River in East Liverpool, Ohio — started in 1871 by brothers Shakespeare and Homer Laughlin.  Shakespeare left the company in 1879. In 1889 William Edwin Wells joined Laughlin, and seven years later they incorporated. Laughlin sold his interest to Wells shortly thereafter. The company was awarded a prize at the 1876 Philadelphia Centennial Exposition, for the best white-ware. The firm experienced rapid growth and opened a new 30-kiln plant in Newell, West Virginia, in 1903 — the companies present manufacturing and headquarters location. By the late 1920s all production was centered at the West Virginia factory and the Ohio site was abandoned.

The company hired Dr. Albert V. Bleininger in 1920, a scientist, author, and educator, who oversaw the conversion of HLCC from bottle kilns to more efficient tunnel kilns. In 1927, the company hired English ceramist Frederick Hurten Rhead, who focused on the design of the company's products and experimented with shapes and glazes. In 1935, this work culminated in his designs for the Fiesta line. 

The company reached its production peak in 1948, manufacturing 10,129,449 items.

In 2010, the company — then known as the Homer Laughlin China Company (HLCC), purchased The Hall China Company in East Liverpool, and under the new name were the two potteries in the area.
As of 2015 the company continued to manufacture all of its products in the United States. A visitor center, museum, and factory outlet are maintained at its headquarters. 

In March 2020, Homer Laughlin China Company (HLCC), owned by the Wells family, sold its food service divisions along with the Homer Laughlin name to Steelite International, a British-based, international tableware manufacturer. HLCC retained its retail division, including the prominent Fiestaware line along with the manufacturing operations and headquarters — rebranding as The Fiesta Tableware Company.  For some time, the food services division had been unprofitable and was unable to compete with inexpensive imported tableware. Because HLCC had been using the Homer Laughlin brand name in its foodservice business, and they were selling that division, the storied name was sold also.

At the time, Elizabeth Wells McIlvain, president of The Homer Laughlin China Company, said the Wells family entered into the sale of the foodservice division to focus exclusively on Fiesta, the company's widely celebrated American retail brand.

Dinnerware lines 

In the 1920s the firm advertised itself as the largest pottery company in the world. Estimates of production range from 25,000 to 35,000 different patterns since production started.

Fiesta

Homer Laughlin began producing the popular and colorful Fiesta line of dinnerware in 1936. Fiesta dinnerware continued to be produced through the late 1960s, with a number of new colors offered before the entire line was phased out in 1973. Fiesta was re-introduced by the company in 1986 and remains in production. The new Fiesta line contains a number of shapes produced from the original molds, although with the change to a fully vitrified (harder) clay body, some modifications to the molds were required which resulted in slight changes to the shape from the original design. Where no modifications were required, the greater shrinkage of the contemporary clay during firing results in the final object being of slightly smaller size then when directly compared to an example of original vintage production. As well many completely new shapes designed for modern day use have been created. Like the original line, the current day production features an evolving number of glaze colors.

Other Retail Lines 

 
In addition to Fiesta, two other lines of colorful dinnerware in bright, solid-colored glazes were introduced in the 1930s. Harlequin was introduced in 1938 as a less expensive alternative to Fiesta and was commissioned by and sold exclusively at Woolworth's stores. The third line of bright solid color ware produced by Homer Laughlin during that era was Riviera dinnerware [1938], which is distinctive for its triple-scalloped corners on a square shape. Riviera was available in red, yellow, light green, mauve blue, ivory [during the war] and occasionally cobalt blue. Production of Riviera ended circa 1948–49.  Harlequin was produced until 1964 and was briefly reintroduced in 1979 for the Woolworth company's 100 year anniversary.

Epicure, a line based on popular colors and shapes of the 1950s was introduced in 1955, and was designed by a student of Russel Wright.
Wright's own dinnerware lines were made by Homer Laughlin rival, Steubenville Pottery in nearby Steubenville, Ohio. Epicure today is a sought after collectible, but it was not well received when introduced and was dropped only 1 year after its debut.

Golden Wheat Line, Homer-Laughlin Company produced the Golden Wheat line between 1949 and 1966. These pieces were added to Duz Detergent boxes as an enticement to buyers.  These dishes feature a center picture of wheat bending in the wind, with a trim on the edge in 22k gold.

Partnership Lines

Modern Star, a short dinnerware china set made by the Homer Laughlin China Company in association with the Taylor, Smith and Taylor Pottery Company and Quaker Oats Company. Modern Star is not a shape but a short dinnerware set with an “atomic style” starburst pattern prominent on each piece of the dinnerware.
The dinnerware line was produced for the Quaker Oats Company as a way for the company to drive sales of its flagship breakfast product. Back then, companies like Quaker Oats would offer dinnerware and household items by marketing to their customers the ability to collect box tops from their products, which consumers could then send in to Quaker Oats with a reduced price per piece or set of the desired pieces of dinnerware the customer wanted to purchase. Customers could purchase small sets or a complete set of dinnerware for up to 6 people. Modern Star was one of the last dinnerware lines the Homer Laughlin China Company manufactured in partnership with Taylor, Smith & Taylor Pottery Company.  The Modern Star Line was discontinued in 1958 and is highly collectible.

Government Lines

HLC maintains contracts with the federal government to supply china and dinnerware for a range of functions. This includes formal dinners to dinnerware for use by US troops at base camps and in the field. A number of these designs are exclusive to the US government.

References

 Collectors Encyclopedia of Fiesta, 7th edition, Huxford.  Collector Books, division of Schroeder Publishing, Inc.
 Collectors Encyclopedia of Russel Wright, 2nd edition, Kerr.

Further reading 
 Berkow, Nancy Pratt. Fiesta Ware. Des Moines: Wallace-Homestead Book Co., 1978.
 Cunningham, Jo. Homer Laughlin China 1940's & 1950's. Atglen, PA: Schiffer Publishing Ltd., 2000.
 Cunningham, Jo. Homer Laughlin China: A Giant among Dishes, 1873-1939. Atglen, PA: Schiffer Pub., 1998.
 Homer Laughlin China Collectors Association. Fiesta, Harlequin, & Kitchen Kraft Tablewares: The Homer Laughlin China Collectors Association Guide. Atglen, PA: Schiffer Pub., 2000.
 Huxford, Sharon & Bob Huxford. The Collectors Encyclopedia of Fiesta, With Harlequin And Riviera. Paducah, KY: Collector Books, 1992.
 Jasper, Joanne. The Collector's Encyclopedia of Homer Laughlin China: Reference & Value Guide. Paducah, KY: Collector Books, 1993.
 Page, Bob, Dale Frederiksen, and Dean Six. Homer Laughlin: Decades of Dinnerware. Greensboro, NC: Page/Frederiksen Publications, 2003.
 Racheter, Richard G. Collector's Guide to Homer Laughlin's Virginia Rose: Identification & Values. Paducah, KY: Collector Books, 1997.
 Racheter, Richard G. "Virginia Rose." Antiques & Collecting Magazine 100 (Aug. 1995) 18–20.
 Schneider, Mike. "Fiesta: A Rainbow at the Table." Antiques & Collecting Hobbies 93 (Aug. 1988): 24–8.
 Snyder, Jeffrey B. Fiesta: The Homer Laughlin China Company's Colorful Dinnerware. Atglen, PA: Schiffer Pub., 2000.

External links 
 Official website
 Official Online Storefront
 Official Overstock Storefront
 Museum Of Ceramics
 D I S H E S: A documentary about collecting Fiesta dishware.
 

Buildings and structures in Hancock County, West Virginia
Ceramics manufacturers of the United States
Manufacturing companies based in West Virginia
Tourist attractions in Hancock County, West Virginia
1871 establishments in Ohio